Middletown station may refer to:

Middletown station (Pennsylvania), an Amtrak station in Middletown, Pennsylvania
Middletown (NJT station), in Middletown, New Jersey
Middletown (San Diego Trolley station), in San Diego
Middletown (Erie Railroad station), a former station in Middletown, New York
Middletown–Town of Wallkill (Metro-North station), or Middletown station, in Middletown, New York
Middletown Road (IRT Pelham Line), a New York City Subway station
Wawa station, a SEPTA Regional Rail station in Middletown Township, Pennsylvania that was briefly referred to as Middletown station

See also
Middletown (disambiguation)